Craig Stewart Walker (born September 25, 1960) is a Canadian writer, theatre director, actor and educator.

Walker graduated from Bayview Secondary School and afterwards, began his career in the theatre as an actor with the Stratford Festival, the Shaw Festival and the National Arts Centre of Canada and other companies.  After returning to complete an M.A. in English and a Ph.D. in Drama at the University of Toronto, he was appointed to the Department of Drama at Queen's University in Kingston, Ontario, where he is currently Professor and Director of the Dan School of Drama and Music.

From 1997 till 2007, Walker served as artistic director of Theatre Kingston, a company for which he has directed many productions including his own Finnegans Wake: a dream play (based on the novel Finnegans Wake by James Joyce), which played in both Kingston and Toronto in 2001, and Aeschylus' The Oresteia, which was performed with Proteus, a satyr play Walker wrote himself to replace the one that had originally followed the trilogy, but had been lost since the 5th century BCE. In 2002, Walker wrote the book, music and lyrics for Chantecler: a musical (based loosely on a verse play by Edmond Rostand). More recently, he has worked as an actor and director with the St. Lawrence Shakespeare Festival in Prescott, Ontario.  That company's production of Twelfth Night, which was directed by Walker, won the 2012 Prix Rideau Award for Outstanding Production.  In 2009 he was appointed as a corresponding scholar with the Shaw Festival.

Works by Walker
The Buried Astrolabe: Canadian Dramatic Imagination and Western Tradition. McGill-Queen's University Press, 2001. 
Finnegans Wake: a dream play (based on the novel by James Joyce).  Produced by Theatre Kingston in 2001.
Chantecler: a musical (book, music and lyrics; based on the play by Edmond Rostand). Produced by Theatre Kingston in 2002.
Editor, with Jennifer Wise, The Broadview Anthology of Drama, Volume One. Broadview Press, 2003. 
Editor, The Broadview Anthology of Drama, Volume Two. Broadview Press, 2003. 
Editor, with Jennifer Wise, The Concise Broadview Anthology of Drama. Broadview Press, 2005. 
Editor, King Lear by William Shakespeare (with facing Folio and Quarto text), The Broadview Anthology of British Literature, Volume Two, ed. Joseph Black, et al.  Broadview Press, 2006.

References

External links
The Buried Astrolabe

1960 births
Living people
20th-century Canadian dramatists and playwrights
21st-century Canadian dramatists and playwrights
Canadian male film actors
Canadian male stage actors
Canadian theatre directors
Academic staff of the Queen's University at Kingston
University of Toronto alumni
People from Richmond Hill, Ontario
Male actors from Ontario
Canadian male dramatists and playwrights
20th-century Canadian male writers
21st-century Canadian male writers
Writers from Ontario
Canadian artistic directors